Kapcypridopsis is a genus of ostracod crustaceans in the family Cyprididae, subfamily Cypridopsinae. It includes the critically endangered species Kapcypridopsis barnardi.

References

Literature
 McKenzie, K.G. 1977: Illustrated generic key to South African continental Ostracoda. Annals of the South African Museum, 74 (3) 45-103.

External links

Podocopida genera
Cyprididae
Taxonomy articles created by Polbot